The Ambassador Extraordinary and Plenipotentiary of the Russian Federation to Pakistan is the official representative of the President and the Government of the Russian Federation to the President and the Government of Pakistan.

The ambassador and his staff work at large in the Embassy of Russia in Islamabad. There is a consulate general in Karachi, and an honorary consul is based in Lahore. 

History of diplomatic relations

Diplomatic relations were established on an embassy level on 1 May 1948, when the Soviet embassy was opened in Karachi, the then  capital of Pakistan. The first ambassador, was appointed on 22 November 1949. In August 1960 the capital of Pakistan was moved to the newly founded city of Islamabad, where the embassy is now based.

List of representatives (1949 – present)

Representatives of the Soviet Union to Pakistan (1949 – 1991)

Representatives of the Russian Federation to Pakistan (1991 – present)

References

External links

Ambassadors of Russia to Pakistan
Russian expatriates in Pakistan
Ambassadors of the Soviet Union to Pakistan
Pakistan
Russia